Shehîd ibn Jerr ("Witness, son of the Jar"; also Shahîd ibn Jarr) is the name for Seth in Yazidism.

Story
According to a narrative among Yazidis, Adam and Eve each deposited their seeds into separate jars. While Eve's seed developed into insects after 9 months, Adam's seed gave birth to Shehid ibn Jerr, the ancestor of the Yazidis, thus portraying Yazidis as having been created separately and differently from all other human beings. However, this story is not found in religious poetic texts such as Qewls, which are the most prestigious and important of the Yazidi religious literature.

According to some Yazidi religious sources, the story of Adam and Eve does not belong to Yazidi religion and moreover, there is a Yazidi folk belief that Yazidis are not from Adam and Eve because according to that narrative, their children (brothers and sisters) married each other. This belief is confirmed by Yazidi religious leaders including Baba Sheikh and Baba Chawish, who regard sibling marriage as a great sin, which is not allowed in Yazidism.

Yazidis consider themselves the people of Adam because after the coming of Islam, Muslims were converting Yazidis to Islam by force, while some Yazidis escaped from Islam and did not convert, other Yazidis who were forced to stay had to consider themselves Adam's people, as it is in Islam, however, in reality, they did not believe in Adam. Many Yazidi religious texts confirm that the story of Adam and Eve was adopted as a result of fear of oppression by Muslims, and that Yazidis existed before Adam.

Qewlê Şêx Erebegî Întûzî:

Holy sites
He has a tomb and a qubbe (conical spire) at Bashiqa, near Mosul.

References

Seth
Yazidi mythology
Legendary progenitors